This is the first edition of the event. Jonathan Eysseric and Nicolas Renavand defeated Ruben Gonzales and Chris Letcher in the final and take the title.

Seeds

  Ruben Gonzales /  Chris Letcher (final)
  Jonathan Eysseric /  Nicolas Renavand (champions)
  Stephan Fransen /  Matwé Middelkoop (semifinals)
  Alejandro González /  Carlos Salamanca (first round)

Draw

Draw

References
 Main Draw

Internationaux de Tennis de BLOIS
2013 Doubles